Marc Ellis Joseph (born 10 November 1976) is an English former professional footballer who played as a defender. He earned twelve caps for the Antigua and Barbuda national team.

Club career
Born in Leicester, East Midlands, Joseph previously played for a number of clubs, including Hull City and Blackpool. Joseph played 86 games for Hull, including playing a part in back-to-back promotions from Division Three (which became League Two) and League One to the Championship, scoring his only goal for the club against Macclesfield. In January 2006 he joined Blackpool, initially on loan from Hull, before making the deal permanent. He was not involved in the club's League One play-off winning campaign in 2006–07, not starting a first-team game between a 4–4 League Trophy draw with Accrington Stanley on 31 October 2006, and his release by the club on 31 May 2007.

He signed for newly relegated League Two side Rotherham United in June 2007. Marc Joseph scored his first Rotherham goal on 29 December 2007 with a fine shot from 25 yards which became the winning goal against Notts County, giving Rotherham their first league win against them after 50 years. Joseph joined Altrincham on 6 August 2010.

In the summer of 2011, Joseph joined Kendal Town on a free transfer, becoming the club captain.

In March 2013 Joseph joined Northern Premier League side Witton Albion. He made his debut on 1 April, making nine appearances and scoring one goal, against his former club Kendal Town.

International career
Joseph played for Antigua and Barbuda in non-FIFA regulated friendlies in June 2008 and made his debut against Saint Kitts and Nevis in a friendly before playing both legs of Antigua's World Cup qualifiers against Cuba.

International goals
Scores and results list Antigua and Barbuda's goal tally first.

Post football career
Joseph now works for Blackpool FC Community Trust.

Honours
Blackpool
League One play-offs: 2006–07

References

External links

Profile at UpThePosh! The Peterborough United Database

1976 births
Living people
Footballers from Leicester
English footballers
Antigua and Barbuda footballers
Antigua and Barbuda international footballers
Association football defenders
Cambridge United F.C. players
Cambridge City F.C. players
Coventry City F.C. players
Peterborough United F.C. players
Hull City A.F.C. players
Bristol City F.C. players
Blackpool F.C. players
Rotherham United F.C. players
Altrincham F.C. players
Kendal Town F.C. players
Witton Albion F.C. players
Northwich Victoria F.C. players
English Football League players
National League (English football) players
English sportspeople of Antigua and Barbuda descent
Black British sportsmen